"H. P. Gets Busy" is a song by American hip hop group High Potent. It was released as a single in 1986. The song features the debut of Jay-Z.

References

American hip hop songs
1986 singles